is a former Japanese football player.

Playing career
Arimura was born in Fukuoka Prefecture on August 25, 1976. After graduating from University of Teacher Education Fukuoka, he joined newly was promoted to J2 League club, Sagan Tosu in 1999. Although he could not play many matches in 1999, he played many matches in 2000 and he became a regular player as right side midfielder in 2001. In 2002, he moved to J2 club Oita Trinita. He became a regular player as left side back and the club won the champions in 2002 and was promoted to J1 League from 2003. Although he played as regular player until 2004, his opportunity to play decreased in 2005. In 2006, he moved to J1 club Nagoya Grampus Eight. He played as regular left side back in early 2006. However he could not play at all in the match from May. In September, he moved to J2 club Vissel Kobe. However he could hardly play in the match. In 2007, he moved to Japan Football League club Rosso Kumamoto (later Roasso Kumamoto). He played as regular player and the club was promoted to J2 from 2008. However his opportunity to play decreased in 2008 and he retired end of 2008 season.

Club statistics

References

External links

1976 births
Living people
University of Teacher Education Fukuoka alumni
Association football people from Fukuoka Prefecture
Japanese footballers
J1 League players
J2 League players
Japan Football League players
Sagan Tosu players
Oita Trinita players
Nagoya Grampus players
Vissel Kobe players
Roasso Kumamoto players
Association football defenders